Gregorio Porideo was an Italian painter of Venice. He was a pupil of Titian.

References

16th-century Italian painters
Italian male painters
Painters from Venice
Italian Renaissance painters
Year of death unknown
Year of birth unknown